Stillorgan is a stop on the Luas light-rail tram system in Dún Laoghaire - Rathdown, south of Dublin, Ireland. It opened in 2004 as a stop on the Green Line.  The stop is located between Blackthorn Avenue and the Stillorgan reservoir, at the intersection with St. Raphaela's Road and serves the suburban area of Stillorgan.  The stop is 500m up the line from Sandyford Luas stop, which was itself built on the site of an old railway station called Stillorgan.

Location and access
Both of the stop's edge platforms can be accessed from either of the adjacent roads, and the stop is of the modular design common to many of the stops on the original route of the Luas. A Park and Ride facility with 341 spaces is shared by Stillorgan and Sandyford Luas stops.  The stop is also served by Dublin Bus routes 11, 47, 75, and 116.

To the south of the stop, the tram line slopes continues along the old railway alignment, alongside the reservoir to Sandyford. To the north, it crosses the road and continues to Kilmacud.

References

Luas Green Line stops in Dún Laoghaire–Rathdown